Glenroy Samuel is the name of:

Glenroy Samuel (footballer, born 1990), Trinidad and Tobago footballer
Glenroy Samuel (footballer, born 1994), Saint Kitts & Nevis footballer